Gymnetis holosericea is a species of beetles of the family Scarabaeidae and subfamily Cetoniinae.

Subspecies
Gymnetis holosericea aureotorquata Bourgoin, 1912
Gymnetis holosericea chanchamayensis Pouillaude, 1913
Gymnetis holosericea distincta Pouillaude, 1913
Gymnetis holosericea flava (Weber, 1801)
Gymnetis holosericea holosericea (Olivier, 1789)
Gymnetis holosericea magnifica Gory & Percheron, 1833

Description
Variability of this species is quite large. The basic color is usually black or dark brown, with yellow or whitish markings on the elytra.

Distribution
This species can be found in Brazil, Ecuador, Bolivia, Colombia and French Guiana.

References

   Biolib
 Catalogue of Life
 Felix Placência Garcia   ASPECTOS BIOLÓGICOS E COMPORTAMENTAIS DE SCARABAEIDAE (COLEOPTERA) NO MATO GROSSO DO SUL
 Cetolys
 Entomofauna

Cetoniinae
Beetles described in 1789